Dobras is a surname. Notable people with the surname include:

Kristijan Dobras (born 1992), Austrian footballer
Radenko Dobraš (born 1968), Serbian basketball player